Highworth is a market town and civil parish in the Borough of Swindon, England, about  north-east of Swindon town centre. The 2011 Census recorded a population of 8,151. The town is notable for its Queen Anne and Georgian buildings, dating from its pre-eminence in the 18th century. It also has a 13th-century church, St. Michael's.

Etymology
The root High references the geography of the town, as it sits on a hill above the Upper Thames Valley. The suffix -worth is derived from the Gothic 𐍅𐌰𐍂, which is transliterated as warō in Old English and as worth in Middle English. It means "those that care for, watch, guard, protect, or defend".

History
Highworth is on a hill in a strategic position above the Upper Thames Valley, and seems to have been occupied almost continuously for 7,000 years. It is mentioned in the Domesday Book as 'Wrde', which derives from the Old English word 'worth' meaning enclosure. The prefix 'High', owing to it being situated on a hill, was not added until around 1200 AD. On John Speed's map of Wiltshire (1611), the name is spelt both Highwoth (for the hundred) and Hiworth (for the town itself). In 1206 it was granted a charter for its market, which is still held weekly. The origins and layout of Highworth are medieval.

Highworth was a Royalist stronghold in the English Civil War, but on 17 June 1645 Sir Thomas Fairfax captured it and Parliamentarian troops garrisoned it until October the next year. The occupation coincided with a severe outbreak of plague. Traders moved their business to Swindon, and Highworth market did not recover until the end of the 17th century. Highworth benefited from the economic boom in the Napoleonic Wars and Industrial Revolution, and many of the houses in the town centre date from this time. From 1894 to 1974 there was a Highworth Rural District but the town is now part of Swindon unitary authority. Highworth was once larger than neighbouring Swindon, when Highworth's population exceeded 12,000.

Geography
Highworth is in north-east Wiltshire, near the border with Oxfordshire.

The parish includes Sevenhampton village and the hamlets of Hampton and Redlands.

Culture and community
The town is twinned with Pontorson in Normandy and Wassenberg in Germany. Highworth Community Centre opened in the former Northview Primary School in June 2011.

Landmarks
The Church of England parish church of St Michael (see below) is at the centre of the town, at the corner of the High Street and the A361 Swindon Road. The centre of the old town, with many fine Georgian and Queen Anne houses, has been a conservation area since 1976.

The Old Manor House in the High Street, parts of which date back to the late 15th century, is a Grade II* listed building.

Transport
Nowadays, the nearest station is at Swindon,  to the southwest. The Great Western Main Line passes through open countryside around 3 miles south of the town, en route to Reading and London.

The A361 road forms a north–south route through Highworth, while the B4019 is on an east–west axis passing through the suburb of Hampton.

Education
Highworth Warneford School is a secondary school on Shrivenham Road. Southfield Junior School borders it, and Eastrop Infant School is nearby.

Churches

The Church of England parish church is dedicated to St Michael and All Angels. The parish includes the churches of St James, Sevenhampton and St John the Baptist, Inglesham. The Highworth Community Church was founded more than 30 years ago and is based in the Community Centre.

Two Methodist chapels were built in 1838 and 1842. The first one proved too small so a new one was built on the Elms in 1856. In 1964 the two congregations combined to build a larger chapel on the current site. This church was in turn enlarged in 1992.

Sport
Highworth Town F.C. is a Non-League football club that plays at the Elms Recreation Ground.

Highworth Cricket Club are in the Wiltshire County Cricket League and South Gloucestershire and Wiltshire Village League (Sundays). The club play at the Elms Recreation Ground.

Public services
Highworth was first recorded as a post town in 1673. From 1835 to 1839 there was a Penny Post between Highworth and Cold Harbour, a village on the Swindon – Cirencester road near Broad Blunsdon. Mrs Mabel Stranks, who was postmistress here in the Second World War, was a key contact for members of the Auxiliary Units, a resistance organisation. A memorial plaque on the wall of the former post office records her contribution.

Notable people

William Joscelyn Arkell, geologist and palaeontologist
Eric Buller MC (1894–1973), British Army officer and cricketer
William Goudge (1877–1967), cricketer
Joseph Knight (1896–1974), cricketer 
Narcissus Marsh, Church of Ireland Archbishop of Armagh
Helen Shapiro, singer
Samuel Wilson Warneford, philanthropist
Alfred Williams (1877–1930), "The Hammerman Poet" of South Marston

Notes

References

External links

Highworth Town Council
Historic Highworth photos at BBC Wiltshire
History of Highworth at Highworth Historical Society

 
Towns in Wiltshire
Civil parishes in Wiltshire
Market towns in Wiltshire
Borough of Swindon